Mission Academy High School is a public charter high school in Phoenix, Arizona.

In 2012, Mission Charter Schools, the charter operator, entered into a partnership with Rite of Passage, the operator of Queen Creek's Canyon State Academy, under which ROP assists Mission with the operation of the school. A new campus location was selected to give the school space at the same time.

References

High schools in Phoenix, Arizona
2007 establishments in Arizona
Educational institutions established in 2007